The Men's high jump at the 2014 Commonwealth Games, as part of the athletics programme, was a two-day event held at Hampden Park on 28 and 30 July 2014.

Records

Results

Qualifying round
Qualification: 2.20 (Q) or 12 best performers (q) advance to the Final.

Final

References

Men's high jump
2014